John Leonard Riddell (February 20, 1807 – October 7, 1865) was a science lecturer, botanist, geologist, medical doctor, chemist, microscopist, numismatist, politician, and science fiction author in the United States. He was born in Leyden, Massachusetts, the son of John Riddell and Lephe Gates. He received his B.A. and M.A. at Rensselaer Polytechnic Institute from professor Amos Eaton and his M.D. from Cincinnati College in 1836.

Biography
Prior to receiving his M.D. Riddell found himself in Marietta, Ohio to study with Dr. Hildreth of Marietta College. As there were not many opportunities for a paid lecturer or a trained botanist he put out 'advertisements in local newspapers' publicizing that he would collect plants for sale. He eventually published, in the Western Republican, one of the first botanical collections made in Ohio by a professional botanist. The specimens were donated to Marietta College and the Hildreth Herbarium. The collection was not adequately preserved and has been destroyed but the lists themselves remain.

He lectured in Ogdensburg, New York, and then in Philadelphia and Cincinnati. From 1836 until his death in 1865, he was Professor of Chemistry at the Medical College of Louisiana (now Tulane University) in New Orleans. While there, he invented the first practical microscope to enable binocular viewing of objects through a single objective lens.  In 1850, he also undertook one of the earliest and most extensive American microscopic investigations of cholera.

Riddell published a science fiction story giving an account of a fictional former student named Orrin Lindsay, who traveled to the moon and Mars.

Following his botanical explorations of Texas, he was appointed melter and refiner of the New Orleans Mint, a position confirmed by President John Tyler following an internal mint dispute. He likewise was appointed Postmaster of New Orleans, which position he held even during the Civil War despite Confederate appointments intended to displace him.

Active in local and state politics, he seems to have claimed to have been elected Governor of Louisiana in November, 1863 and sworn in by a justice of the peace in January, 1864. During this time the military Governor George F. Shepley was still in actual power. His governorship was rejected in the course of a Congressional inquiry into a contested election in the House.

References

External links 

 

People from Leyden, Massachusetts
Rensselaer Polytechnic Institute alumni
University of Cincinnati alumni
1807 births
1865 deaths
Burials at Metairie Cemetery
American scientists